Sean Joseph Morey (born February 26, 1976) is a former American football wide receiver in the National Football League (NFL).  He played college football at Brown.  He was drafted by the New England Patriots in the seventh round of the 1999 NFL Draft.  Morey also played for the Philadelphia Eagles, Pittsburgh Steelers and Arizona Cardinals.  He earned a Super Bowl ring with the Steelers in Super Bowl XL against the Seattle Seahawks.

Early years
Morey graduated from Marshfield High School of Marshfield, Massachusetts in 1994. Because of his light weight, Morey did not receive a scholarship offer from his dream school Boston College and had a partial scholarship offer from Northeastern University, so he decided to attend Hebron Academy.  At Hebron, Morey led the football team to win the New England Prep School Class D Championship in 1994. He would win All-Evergreen League Team, Evergreen League MVP, and Class D New England Player of the Year while playing football for Hebron.  He played both wide receiver and defensive back while in high school.

College career
After graduating from Hebron Academy, he attended Brown University, where he finished with an Ivy League record 251 receptions for 3,850 yards and 40 touchdowns, and was voted Ivy League player of the year in 1997 — when he caught 74 passes for an Ivy League-record 1,434 yards and 15 touchdowns.  Sean was one of seven Brown players selected as First-Team All-Ivy League in 1998, including Stephen Campbell (WR), Zack Burns (TE), Tim Hevesy (C), James Perry (QB), Alex Pittz (CB) and Ephraim "Fry" Wernick (DL). Sean Morey finished his career second in all-time receiving yards in Division I-AA behind only Jerry Rice. After his college career, Sean was the first Brown player to have his number retired. He also earned a degree with honors in organizational behavior and management.

Morey won the Ivy League Bushnell Cup in 1997.

Professional career

New England Patriots
Morey was originally selected with the 35th pick of the seventh round of the 1999 NFL Draft by the New England Patriots.  He remained with the Patriots until the end of the 2000 season, with the majority of his time being spent on the practice squad.  Sean Morey caught Tom Brady's first career pass.

Philadelphia Eagles
In 2001 Morey joined the Philadelphia Eagles where he would become 2003 Special Teams MVP. That same year he was nominated for Dr. Z's (Sports Illustrated) All-Pro team as a special teams player. Also in 2003, Morey became the 12th player in NFL Europe history to catch 3 touchdown passes in a game while playing for the Barcelona Dragons.

Pittsburgh Steelers
The Steelers acquired Morey September 6, 2004 as an unrestricted free agent. He was captain of special teams for Pittsburgh.  Morey's role for the Steelers was mostly special teams; he did not usually line up at wide receiver.  In 2006, Morey's role expanded because of injuries to wide receivers Hines Ward and Cedrick Wilson.  He finished the season with just 2 receptions (bringing his career total to 3), but also contributed with his blocking and with his work on special teams. He collected a team-high 21 special teams tackles while also returning eight kickoffs for 202 yards (25.3 yard avg.). In a Week 11 24-20 victory over the Browns, he had a 76-yard kickoff return.

Arizona Cardinals
The Arizona Cardinals signed Morey on March 15, 2007 to a three-year free agent contract. Morey rejoined ex-Steeler coaches Ken Whisenhunt (head coach), Russ Grimm (assistant head coach / offensive line) and Kevin Spencer (special teams) in Arizona.

The Cardinals released Morey on March 17, 2008, but re-signed him on March 26.

Morey blocked a punt in overtime against the Cowboys on October 12, 2008 that was run in by teammate, Monty Beisel, for the game-winning touchdown.  It was the first time in NFL history that a game was ended in overtime by a blocked punt that resulted in a touchdown.

Morey was selected to the Pro Bowl in 2008 as a special teamer.

Seattle Seahawks
Morey signed with the Seattle Seahawks on March 29, 2010. He never played a game for them, however, announcing his retirement due to concussions just hours before the start of training camp on July 31.

Coaching
In February 2014, Morey accepted the head coach position for the Sprint Football team at Princeton University.  For the two previous years, he was a Department of Athletics Fellow for general administration at Princeton. Princeton shut down the sprint football team after two seasons with Morey as coach; Morey failed to win a single game as coach of the Tigers, continuing a 16-year-long losing streak.

Now, Morey is a high school football coach at Notre Dame High School in Lawrenceville, New Jersey as a Defensive Coordinator.

Concussion activism
In May 2014, Morey, along with a group of plaintiffs, filed a formal objection to the National Football League Players' Concussion Injury Litigation and Proposed Settlement being overseen by US District Court Judge Anita Brody. The objection sought to highlight what some players see as a narrow scope of the settlement, claiming, among other things, that "The settlement would have compensated only a small subset of [mild-traumatic-brain-injury-related] injuries to the exclusion of all others."

Personal
His wife, Cara formerly played defense for the Brampton Thunder of the  Canadian Women's Hockey League in Ontario after starting at Brown in ice hockey and field hockey. His father, Dennis, was also a semi-pro football player with several teams, including the Brockton, MA Pros, his grandfather, Joe, and his great uncle, Dick, both have been inducted to the Bridgewater State Hall of Fame for basketball. He has three daughters, Devan, Kathryn "Kate", and Shea "Piper".

Morey was featured on an episode of the Canadian sports/comedy program Cabbie on the Street, where it was revealed he lives in Toronto during the offseason. Morey appeared in Sports Illustrated'''s "Faces in the Crowd" feature in the magazine's January 12, 1998 issue.

Morey and his wife Cara were featured in a November 2007 episode of the HGTV show Divine Design''.

In October 2010, Morey was named co-chair of the NFL Players Association's newly formed Concussion and Traumatic Brain Injury Committee.  Morey suffered more than twenty concussions in his career.  Morey's committee has two main goals: the diagnosis, treatment, and prevention of concussions and traumatic brain injuries in active players and research into the long-term cumulative effects of such injuries on NFL players.

On January 31, 2014, Morey and his wife were interviewed about traumatic brain injury in football players by Melissa Block on NPR's "All Things Considered."

See also
Living former players diagnosed with or reporting symptoms of chronic traumatic encephalopathy

References

External links

Arizona Cardinals bio

1976 births
Living people
People from Marshfield, Massachusetts
Sportspeople from Plymouth County, Massachusetts
Players of American football from Massachusetts
American football wide receivers
Brown Bears football players
National Conference Pro Bowl players
New England Patriots players
Barcelona Dragons players
Philadelphia Eagles players
Pittsburgh Steelers players
Arizona Cardinals players
Seattle Seahawks players
Concussion activists
Hebron Academy alumni